Aloe scobinifolia is a small, stemless Aloe from Somalia.

See also
Succulent plant

References

scobinifolia
Flora of Somalia